Culhwch and Olwen is a Welsh tale that survives in only two manuscripts about a hero connected with Arthur and his warriors: a complete version in the Red Book of Hergest, c. 1400, and a fragmented version in the White Book of Rhydderch, c. 1325. It is the longest of the surviving Welsh prose tales. Lady Charlotte Guest included this tale among those she collected under the title The Mabinogion.

Synopsis
Culhwch's father, King Cilydd son of Celyddon, loses his wife Goleuddydd after a difficult childbirth. When he remarries, the young Culhwch rejects his stepmother's attempt to pair him with his new stepsister. Offended, the new queen puts a curse on him so that he can marry no one besides the beautiful Olwen, daughter of the giant Ysbaddaden Pencawr. Though he has never seen her, Culhwch becomes infatuated with her, but his father warns him that he will never find her without the aid of his famous cousin Arthur. The young man immediately sets off to seek his kinsman. He finds him at his court in Celliwig in Cornwall.

Arthur agrees to lend help in whatever capacity Culhwch asks, save the lending of his sword Caledfwlch and other named armaments, or his wife. He sends not only six of his finest warriors (Cai, Bedwyr, Gwalchmei, Gwrhyr Gwalstawd Ieithoedd, Menw son of Tairgwaedd, Cynddylig Gyfarwydd), but a huge list of personages of various skills (including Gwynn ap Nudd) recruited to join Culhwch in his search for Olwen. The group meets some relatives of Culhwch's that know Olwen and agree to arrange a meeting. Olwen is receptive to Culhwch's attraction, but she cannot marry him unless her father Ysbaddaden "Chief Giant" agrees, and he, unable to survive past his daughter's wedding, will not consent until Culhwch completes a series of about forty impossible-sounding tasks, including the obtaining of the basket/hamper of Gwyddneu Garanhir, the hunt of Ysgithyrwyn chief boar. The completion of only a few of these tasks is recorded and the giant is killed, leaving Olwen free to marry her lover.

Scholarship 
The prevailing view among scholars was that the present version of the text was composed by the 11th century, making it perhaps the earliest Arthurian tale and one of Wales' earliest extant prose texts, but a 2005 reassessment by linguist Simon Rodway dates it to the latter half of the 12th century. The title is a later invention and does not occur in early manuscripts. 

The story is on one level a folktale, belonging to the bridal quest "the giant's daughter" tale type (more formally categorized as Six Go through the Whole World type, AT 513A). The accompanying motifs (the strange birth, the jealous stepmother, the hero falling in love with a stranger after hearing only her name, helpful animals, impossible tasks) reinforce this typing. 

However, the bridal quest serves merely as a frame story for the rest of the events that form the in-story, where the title characters go largely unmentioned. The in-story is taken up by two long lists and the adventures of King Arthur and his men. One list is a roster of names, some two hundred of the greatest men, women, dogs, horses and swords in Arthur's kingdom recruited to aid Arthur's kinsman Culhwch in his bridal quest. The other is a list of "difficult tasks" or "marvels" (pl. ), set upon Culhwch as requirements for his marriage to be approved by the bride's father Ysbaddaden. Included in this list are names taken from Irish legend, hagiography, and sometimes actual history. 

The fight against the terrible boar Twrch Trwyth certainly has antecedents in Celtic tradition, namely Arthur's boar-hunt with his hound Cafall, whose footprint is discussed in the Mirabilia appended to the Historia Brittonum. The description of Culhwch riding on his horse is frequently mentioned for its vividness, and features of the Welsh landscape are narrated in ways that are reminiscent of Irish onomastic narratives. As for the passage where Culhwch is received by his uncle, King Arthur, at Celliwig, this is one of the earliest instances in literature or oral tradition of Arthur's court being assigned a specific location and a valuable source of comparison with the court of Camelot or Caerleon as depicted in later Welsh, English, and continental Arthurian legends.

Cultural influence
Culhwch's horse-ride passage is reused in the 16th-century prose "parody" Araith Wgon, as well as in 17th-century poetic adaptations of that work. The Tolkien scholar Tom Shippey has pointed out the similarities between The Tale of Beren and Lúthien, one of the main cycles of J. R. R. Tolkien's legendarium, and Culhwch and Olwen.

Adaptations
 British painter/poet David Jones (1895–1974) wrote a poem called "The Hunt" based on the tale of Culwhch ac Olwen. A fragment of a larger work, "The Hunt" takes place during the pursuit of the boar Twrch Trwyth by Arthur and the various war-bands of Celtic Britain and France.
 In 1988, Gwyn Thomas released a retelling of the story, Culhwch ac Olwen, which was illustrated by Margaret Jones. Culhwch ac Olwen won the annual Tir na n-Og Award for Welsh language nonfiction in 1989.
 A shadow play adaptation of Culhwch and Olwen toured schools in Ceredigion during 2003. The show was created by Jim Williams and was supported by Theatr Felinfach.
 The tale of Culhwch and Olwen was adapted by Derek Webb in Welsh and English as a dramatic recreation for the reopening of Narberth Castle in Pembrokeshire in 2005.
 The Ballad of Sir Dinadan, the fifth book of Gerald Morris's The Squire's Tales series, features an adaptation of Culhwch's quest.

Explanatory notes

References

Sources

External links

 Culhwch ac Olwen e-text
 Culhwch ac Olwen translation
 Article on Culhwch and Olwen on Celtic website Transceltic.com
 bbc.co.uk – Wales – History

11th-century books
12th-century books
Arthurian literature in Welsh
Mabinogion
Pigs in literature
Taliesin
Medieval Welsh literature
Welsh mythology
Welsh-language literature